Vilmar may refer to:

 Vilmar, Iowa, unincorporated community in the United States
 August Friedrich Christian Vilmar (1800–1868), German Neo-Lutheran theologian
 Vilmar (footballer) (born 1968), full name Vilmar Barbosa Santos, Brazilian footballer

See also
 Sabia (footballer) (born 1982), full name Vilmar da Cunha Rodrigues, Brazilian footballer